The Port of Missing Girls is a 1928 silent film directed by Irving Cummings. It stars Barbara Bedford and Hedda Hopper, making it one of the rare occasions Hopper actually starred in a film.  This film is preserved in the Library of Congress.

Cast
Barbara Bedford - Ruth King
Malcolm McGregor - Buddie Larkins
Natalie Kingston - Catherine King
Hedda Hopper - Mrs. C. King
George Irving - Cyrus King
Wyndham Standing - Mayor McKibben
Charles K. Gerrard - DeLeon (billed as Charles Gerrard)
Paul Nicholson - George Hamilton
Edith Yorke - Mrs. Blane
Bodil Rosing - Elsa
Rosemary Theby - School Matron
Lotus Thompson - Anne
Amber Norman - Marjorie

Reception
In the July 31, 1928 issue of the New York Daily News, the newspaper's film critic Irene Thirer began grading movies on a scale of zero to three stars. Three stars meant 'excellent,' two 'good,' and one star meant 'mediocre.' And no stars at all 'means the picture's right bad,'" wrote Thirer. The Port of Missing Girls received one star; Carl Bialik speculates that this may have been the first time a film critic used a star-rating system to grade movies.

References

External links

allmovie/synopsis 
 Lobby card for The Port of Missing Girls 1928
Lobby poster

1928 films
American silent feature films
Films directed by Irving Cummings
1928 drama films
Silent American drama films
American black-and-white films
1920s American films